Statistics of Football League First Division in the 1970–71 season.

Overview
Arsenal won the First Division title for the eighth time in the club's history that season. They also won the FA Cup to complete the club's first double. Arsenal wrapped up the title on 3 May, with a 1–0 win at North London rivals Tottenham Hotspur. Blackpool were relegated on 12 April, after only holding Tottenham Hotspur to a 0–0 draw at home. Burnley joined them on 24 April, after losing 2–1 at home to Derby County, which meant West Ham United's 1–1 draw at Manchester United saved the Hammers from relegation.

League standings

Results

Managerial changes

Team locations

Top goalscorers
Goalscorers are listed order of total goals, then according to the number of league goals, then of FA cup goals, then of League Cup goals. A dash means the team of the player in question did not participate in European competitions.

The listing above is from the Rothmans Football Yearbook 1971–72, pp. 465–468. The Queen Anne Press Limited. Compiled by Tony Williams and Roy Peskett. Editorial Board: Denis Howell, Sir Matt Busby, David Coleman, Jimmy Hill, Tony Williams and Roy Peskett.

References

RSSSF

Football League First Division seasons
Eng
1970–71 Football League
1970–71 in English football leagues